is a railway station on the Tokyu Ikegami Line in Ota, Tokyo, Japan, operated by the private railway operator Tokyu Corporation.

Station layout
The station has two underground side platforms.

Platforms

History
The station opened on 28 August 1927. It was rebuilt as an underground station in June 1972.

Bus services
 Nagahara bus stop (Tokyu Bus)

References

External links
 Nagahara Station (Tokyu)   

Railway stations in Tokyo
Railway stations in Japan opened in 1927
Tokyu Ikegami Line
Stations of Tokyu Corporation